Sagre Bambangi (born May 2, 1966) is a Ghanaian politician and member of the Seventh Parliament of the Fourth Republic of Ghana representing the Walewale Constituency in the Northern Region on the ticket of the New Patriotic Party.

Personal life 
Bambangi is a Muslim. He is married (with six children).

Early life and education 
Bambangi was born on May 2, 1966. He hails from Wungu, a town in the Northern Region of Ghana. He attended Navrongo Senior High School and obtained SC/GCEO O level and GCE A kevel. He entered University of Ghana and obtained his Doctor of Philosophy degree in Agricultural Economics in 2009. He was a lecturer at the University for Development Studies from 1997 to 2016.

Politics 
Bambangi is a member of the New Patriotic Party (NPP). In 2012, he contested for the Walewale seat on the ticket of the NPP sixth parliament of the fourth republic and won.

Employment 
He is a lecturer in economics at the University for Development Studies - Wa Campus.

He has been a Member of the Parliament since January 7, 2013; he is in his second term.

References

Ghanaian MPs 2017–2021
1966 births
Living people
Ghanaian Muslims
New Patriotic Party politicians
University of Ghana alumni